The abbreviation BHCC may refer to:

 Brighton and Hove City Council, an English local authority
 The British Hill Climb Championship, a motorsport competition in the UK
 Bunker Hill Community College, a community college in Charlestown, Massachusetts, USA
 Brighton Hill Community College, a secondary school in Basingstoke, UK